The Diplôme d'Ingénieur (often abbreviated as Dipl. Ing.) is a postgraduate degree in engineering (see Engineer's Degrees in Europe) usually awarded by the Grandes Écoles in engineering. It is generally obtained after five to seven years of studies after the Baccalauréat.

Each holder of the diplôme d'ingénieur is also conferred the title of Ingénieur diplômé (graduate engineer). This is distinguished from the term 'ingénieur' (engineer) which is less-regulated. The diplôme d'ingénieur is recognized as Master of Science in Engineering in the United States and in the countries of the European Union (also in France).

Most Grande Ecole give the opportunity to their students to join a double degree with a university (in France or abroad). Furthermore, Diplôme d'ingénieur graduates can pursue a selective PhD after their engineering studies to later join academia or an industrial R&D department.

Accreditation
The title Ingénieur diplômé is a strictly regulated and protected by the state. Any institution issuing the diplôme d'ingénieur must be accredited by the Commission des titres d'ingénieur (within the Ministry of Higher Education and Research) which is the official administrative body responsible for evaluating higher education institutions to train professional engineers. Anyone found to be misusing the title of Ingénieur diplômé is liable to a €15,000 fine and a one-year sentence in prison.

Since the signing of the Bologna Process in 1999, the European Master's Degree is also conferred by the state to the holder of a diplôme d'ingénieur.

The diplôme d'ingénieur is also recognized in the United States by the AACRAO since 2013 as "Master of Science in Engineering".

Grandes Écoles and Universities
France, Morocco, and Tunisia are particular in that it is mainly the Grandes Écoles in engineering that is accredited and is certified to issue the diplôme d'ingénieur, which is differentiated from bachelor's and master's degrees in engineering issued by public universities (Universités).

Universities in France, Morocco, and Tunisia are comprehensive institutions composed of several faculties covering various fields (natural sciences, engineering, law, economics, medicine, humanities, etc.) with a large student body. On the other hand, Grandes Écoles in engineering are much smaller in size and recruit their students with more selective processes (typically a few hundred students per year per institution, and a few thousand students per year country-wide).

Curriculum
Student engineers in Grandes Écoles are educated in close cooperation with the various industries through academic-industry partnerships, which introduce graduates to professional life while giving them a solid grounding in their discipline. As many graduates will advance to positions leading future projects and teams, courses related to management and professional training are also included in the curriculum.

In addition to the core curriculum in engineering and science, the engineer training often includes, and is not limited to:
 courses in humanities and social sciences
 courses in business administration
 visits to production sites
 conferences and career talks by professionals
 internships and research projects

Professional training
More than 90 percent of the engineer programs require at least one internship (typically in a business setting) at some point in the curriculum.

Most schools arrange three types of internships that train the students with progressive responsibilities, initially as observers and increasingly as actors, in order to gain a comprehensive understanding and perspective of all levels of responsibility and roles within the industry. One can distinguish “worker” (blue-collar) internships, “senior technician” internships, and “graduate” internships where the students perform the same type of work they will do as graduate engineers. Internships are graded and constitute part of the academic degree requirements.

See also
 Memorandum of understanding

References

External links

Master's degrees
Education in France
Business qualifications